Sorry to Disturb is a 2008 Egyptian film directed by Khaled Marei. It stars Ahmed Helmi as an young aviation engineer who feels lonely, out of place, and depressed. One day he meets a beautiful girl at a cafe (Menna Shalabi), and starts dating her. His life is turned upside down, as he learns that he has schizophrenia, and that he has been having visual hallucinations of his late father and his girlfriend.

The film won first prize at the Egyptian National film festival and won the Dear Guest magazine award for best movie of 2008. Helmi won the Egyptian Catholic Center Cinema Festival award for Best Actor for the third year running, and the film won Best Film, Best Director, Best Script, and Best Production.

The soundtrack includes "Don't Speak" by No Doubt and "Buddha Bar" by Wally Brill.

References

External links

2000s mystery comedy-drama films
2000s Arabic-language films
2008 films
Egyptian comedy-drama films
2008 comedy films
2008 drama films
Egyptian mystery films